Count Agostino Paradisi (25 April 1736, Vignola - 19 February 1783, Reggio nell'Emilia) was an Italian poet, economist and teacher. His son Giovanni Paradisi was a scientist.

External links
 

1736 births
1783 deaths
Italian economists
Italian poets